Fui Yiu Ha is the name of several villages in Hong Kong:

 Fui Yiu Ha (Sai Kung) in Sai Kung Town
 Fui Yiu Ha (Tun Chung) in Tung Chung
 Fui Yiu Ha New Village in Sha Tin District